Ben Newton (born 8 August 1992) is a former professional Australian rules footballer who played for the Port Adelaide Football Club and Melbourne Football Club in the Australian Football League (AFL).

He made his AFL debut against Greater Western Sydney in round 7 of the 2014 AFL season.

At the end of the 2014 season, Newton left Port Adelaide citing that he wanted more opportunities at AFL level. He was subsequently recruited by Melbourne as a delisted free agent. At the conclusion of the 2016 season, he was delisted by Melbourne.

Statistics

|- style="background-color: #EAEAEA"
! scope="row" style="text-align:center" | 2011
|
| 38 || 0 || — || — || — || — || — || — || — || — || — || — || — || — || — || —
|- 
! scope="row" style="text-align:center" | 2012
|
| 38 || 0 || — || — || — || — || — || — || — || — || — || — || — || — || — || —
|- style="background-color: #EAEAEA"
! scope="row" style="text-align:center" | 2013
|
| 38 || 0 || — || — || — || — || — || — || — || — || — || — || — || — || — || —
|- 
! scope="row" style="text-align:center" | 2014
|
| 38 || 4 || 0 || 2 || 18 || 22 || 40 || 9 || 9 || 0.0 || 0.5 || 4.5 || 5.5 || 10.0 || 2.3 || 2.3
|- style="background-color: #EAEAEA"
! scope="row" style="text-align:center" | 2015
|
| 19 || 11 || 11 || 6 || 88 || 75 || 163 || 28 || 36 || 1.0 || 0.5 || 8.0 || 6.8 || 14.8 || 2.6 || 3.3
|- 
! scope="row" style="text-align:center" | 2016
|
| 19 || 2 || 1 || 0 || 14 || 20 || 34 || 6 || 5 || 0.5 || 0.0 || 7.0 || 10.0 || 17.0 || 3.0 || 2.5
|- class="sortbottom"
! colspan=3| Career
! 17
! 12
! 8
! 120
! 117
! 237
! 43
! 50
! 0.7
! 0.5
! 7.1
! 6.9
! 13.9
! 2.5
! 2.9
|}

References

External links

Ben Newton's profile from Demonwiki

1992 births
Living people
Port Adelaide Football Club players
Port Adelaide Football Club players (all competitions)
Australian rules footballers from Western Australia
Melbourne Football Club players
Casey Demons players